Eridolius is a genus of wasps.

Species 
 Eridolius aithogaster
 Eridolius alacer
 Eridolius albicoxa
 Eridolius albilineatus
 Eridolius astenoctenus
 Eridolius aurifluus
 Eridolius autumnalis
 Eridolius basalis
 Eridolius bimaculatus
 Eridolius brevicornis
 Eridolius clauseni
 Eridolius clypeatus
 Eridolius consobrinus
 Eridolius consors
 Eridolius curtisii
 Eridolius dahlbomi
 Eridolius deletus
 Eridolius dorsator
 Eridolius elegans
 Eridolius ermolenkoi
 Eridolius flavicoxae
 Eridolius flavicoxator
 Eridolius flavomaculatus
 Eridolius foveator
 Eridolius frontator
 Eridolius funebris
 Eridolius gibbulus
 Eridolius gnathoxanthus
 Eridolius hofferi
 Eridolius kambaiti
 Eridolius kamikochi
 Eridolius lineiger
 Eridolius lionyx
 Eridolius mongolicus
 Eridolius niger
 Eridolius orbitalis
 Eridolius orientalis
 Eridolius pachysoma
 Eridolius pallicoxator
 Eridolius paululus
 Eridolius pictus
 Eridolius pullus
 Eridolius pygmaeus
 Eridolius romani
 Eridolius rubricoxa
 Eridolius rufilabris
 Eridolius rufofasciatus
 Eridolius rufonotatus
 Eridolius schiödtei
 Eridolius similis
 Eridolius sinensis
 Eridolius taigensis
 Eridolius tobiasi
 Eridolius ungularis
 Eridolius ussuriensis
 Eridolius verzhutzkii
 Eridolius wahli

References 

 Towards revision of the ichneumonid genus Eridolius Forster (Hymenoptera, Ichneumonidae). DR Kasparyan, Ent. Obozr., 1985

External links 
 
 

Ichneumonidae genera